The Tui Cakau is the Paramount Chief of Cakaudrove Province in Fiji.  In Modern Fiji this chiefly title is regarded as the most senior in the Tovata Confederacy, and the third most senior in the country.

Recent history 
The current Tui Cakau is Ratu Naiqama Lalabalavu; he was installed on 8 May 2001 in succession to his father, Ratu Glanville Lalabalavu, who died in 1999.  In April 2002, the courts dismissed a challenge from a rival claimant, Ratu Epeli Ganilau.

Perhaps the best-known Tui Cakau in modern times was Ratu Sir Penaia Ganilau, who held the title from 1988 to 1993.  He was Fiji's last Governor-General and first President.  The present Tui Cakau, Ratu Naiqama Lalabalavu, led a political party, the Conservative Alliance (CAMV) and was a Minister in the government of Prime Minister Laisenia Qarase from 2000 to 2005, when he was convicted of involvement in the coup d'état that deposed the elected government in 2000.  On 3 April he became the first-ever Cabinet Minister to be imprisoned while in office, and resigned from the Cabinet four days later.  He was released on 14 April, to serve the remainder of his eight-month sentence extramurally.  He is the highest-ranked chief in modern times to have been imprisoned.

Following his release, Lalabalavu was reinstated as a Cabinet Minister. The CAMV merged with Prime Minister Qarase's Soqosoqo Duavata ni Lewenivanua (SDL) ahead of the 2006 elections, and Lalabalavu remained in both Parliament and the Cabinet until a military coup deposed the government on 5 December 2006. He returned to Parliament at the 2014 elections as a candidate of the Social Democratic Liberal Party (SDLP), the successor to the SDL.

A brief history
The Tui Cakau ruled what was effectively an independent state until 1865, when Cakaudrove joined the Confederacy of Independent Kingdoms of Viti under the chairmanship of Seru Epenisa Cakobau, the Vunivalu of Bau.  This lasted only until 1867, when the Confederacy was split into two units, the Kingdom of Bau (ruled by Cakobau) and the Confederation of Lau (consisting of the present-day provinces of Cakaudrove, Bua, and Lau).  The then Tui Cakau, Ratu Goleanavanua, became the first Captain Supreme of the Confederation of Lau; he was succeeded two years later by Enele Ma'afu, who reigned until the Confederation of Lau joined the united Kingdom of Viti in 1871.

Title holders

References
 Fiji. - Page 215, by Korina Miller, Robyn Jones, Leonardo Pinheiro - Published by Lonely Planet, 2003. reference to The Tui Cakau.
 Apologies To Thucydides: Understanding History as Culture and Vice Versa - Page 283, by Marshall David Sahlins, Published by University of Chicago Press.  reference to The Tui Cakau.
 Tradition Versus Democracy in the South Pacific: Fiji, Tonga and Western Samoa By Stephanie Lawson - Page 55, Published by Cambridge University Press.

External links 
 Tui Cakau

 
Fijian chiefs